Akira Masaya (1870–1946) was a Director of the Karafuto Agency (1916–1919, 1924–1926). He was governor of Ōita (1911–1913) and Saitama Prefecture (1914–1916). He was a graduate of the University of Tokyo.

1870 births
1946 deaths
People from Okayama Prefecture
University of Tokyo alumni
Governors of Saitama Prefecture
Governors of Ōita
Directors of the Karafuto Agency